{{DISPLAYTITLE:C11H14N2O}}
The molecular formula C11H14N2O (molar mass : 190.24 g/mol, exact mass : 190.110613) may refer to:

 Cytisine
 4,4'-Dimethylaminorex
 4-HO-AMT
 Indantadol
 5-Methoxytryptamine
 2-Methyl-5-hydroxytryptamine
 α-Methylserotonin
 N-Methylserotonin